The Coach of the Year Trophy is an award given by Ice Hockey Journalists UK to the best coach in the Elite League and the English Premier League at the end of each season. In previous seasons it has been awarded to coaches in the British Hockey League's Premier and First Divisions, the Super League and the British National League. The trophy was first awarded in 1985.

Coach of the Year Trophy winners

See also
Man of Ice Awards

References
Ice Hockey Journalists UK

British ice hockey trophies and awards
Ice Hockey Journalists UK
United K

Awards established in 1985
1985 establishments in the United Kingdom
Annual events in the United Kingdom